Lake Kundi (Swahili:  "group") is located in South Darfur, Sudan, Africa. The perennial, endorheic lake is situated at the mouth of Ibrah River, near the seasonal Bahr al-Arab. The nearest town is Al-Fashir,  to the north. The lake is shallow,  in depth, depending upon the season. Radom National Park is located to the southwest.

Flora and fauna
Its vegetation is characterized by Ceratophyllum demersum and Nymphaea lotus.

Clarias lazera and Tilapia zillii fish species are found here, and there is an artisanal fishery. Lake Kundi includes the protomonad Rhipidodendron huxleyi, a faunal species previously not recorded in Africa.

Of the avifauna, 5000-7000 Sudan crowned crane have been reported. Other bird life includes yellow-billed stork, Abdim's stork, African sacred ibis, Arabian bustard, African collared dove, golden nightjar, red-throated bee-eater, yellow-billed shrike, piapiac, red-pate cisticola, foxy cisticola, cricket longtail, Senegal eremomela, chestnut-bellied starling, black scrub-robin, chestnut-crowned sparrow-weaver, bush petronia, black-rumped waxbill.

Conservation
Lake Kundi is classified as an Important Bird Area. The Lake Kundi Bird Sanctuary is an Animal sanctuary whose  protected area includes the lake.

References

South Darfur
Kundi
Important Bird Areas of Sudan